Botanical gardens in Argentina have collections consisting entirely of Argentina native and endemic species; most have a collection that include plants from around the world. There are botanical gardens and arboreta in all states and territories of Argentina, most are administered by local governments, some are privately owned.

This list of botanical gardens and arboretums in Argentina is intended to include all significant botanical gardens and arboretums in Argentina.

 Administración de Parques Nacionales
 Arboretum Guaycolec y Arboretum de la Facultad de Recursos Naturales
 Utkarsh botanical garden
 Asociación Civil Los Algarrobos
 Bosque Autóctono "El Espinal"
 Facultad de Ciencias Forestales, Universidad Nacional de Misiones
 Fundación Cultural Argentino Japonesa
 Jardín Agrobotánico de Santa Catalina
 Jardín Biológico de América
 Jardín Botánico "Arturo E. Ragonese"
 Buenos Aires Botanical Garden – Jardín Botánico "Carlos Thays"
 Jardín Botánico de Chacras de Coria
 Jardín Botánico de Córdoba
 Jardín Botánico de la Ciudad de Corrientes
 Jardín Botánico de la Facultad de Agronomía de Azul
 Jardín Botánico de la Facultad de Ciencias Agrarias de Esperanza
 Jardín Botánico de la Facultad de Ciencias Forestales de la U.N.S.E.
 Jardín Botánico de la Fundación Miguel Lillo
 Jardín Botánico de la Patagonia Extra-andina
 Jardín Botánico "Dr Miguel J Culaciati"
 Jardín Botánico "El Viejo Molino"
 Jardín Botánico EMETA Chamical
 Jardín Botánico Ezeiza
 Jardín Botánico "Gaspar Xuarez", Universidad Católica de Córdoba
 Jardín Botánico Municipal de San Carlos Centro
 Jardín Botánico Municipal y Area de Emprendimientos Productivos
 Jardín Botánico Oro Verde
 Jardín Botánico Pillahuincó
 Jardín Botánico "Tierra del Sur"
 Jardín Botánico Universidad Nacional de San Luis
 Jardín de Aclimatación del Arido Patagónico
 Jardin de Cactus Catamarca
 Museo de Ciencias Naturales "Augusto G Schulz"
 Parque Botánico "Paul Gunther Lorentz", Catamarca
 Red Argentina de Jardines Botánicos

References 

Argentina
Botanical gardens